Silicon Embrace is a 1996 English language science fiction novel by John Shirley.

Set in the near future, it tells the story of a group of journalists in the course of a Second American Civil War. The second civil war in the story is between "religious and ethnic" factions. The main characters get involved in a plot set by obscure entities within the US government together with an alien race from Zeta Reticuli, called the Zetans, who are supposedly friendly to Earth. A second group of aliens, called the Meta, are initially considered hostile. As the novel progresses, layers are peeled away and some of the truth, but not all of it, is revealed.

Kirkus Reviews writes that the story has "thrills and spills" but that Shirley's own "private theology" is too obvious in the story. The Library Journal review considered the book a "marginal purchase" for libraries. The Washington Post called the novel a "hybrid sf/horror novel that may satisfy neither camp." Publishers Weekly was more friendly in their review, writing that readers who enjoy conspiracy theories and New Age myths, along with UFOs will enjoy the book.

References 

1996 American novels
1996 science fiction novels
American science fiction novels
Novels about ancient astronauts